Fucked Up Inside is a 1993 live album by the British space rock band Spiritualized. It was originally available only via mail order, and the name comes from the song "Medication". Image by British Photographer Andrew Penketh

Track listing
"Take Good Care of It" - 4:49
"I Want You" - 3:18
"Medication" - 7:34
"Angel Sigh" - 5:10
"Walking With Jesus" - 5:03
"Shine a Light (Clear Light/Clear Rush)" - 14:39
"Smiles" - 6:35

Spiritualized albums
1993 live albums
Dedicated Records live albums